George Thomas Kenyon (28 December 1840 – 26 January 1908) was a British Conservative Party politician who sat in the House of Commons in two periods between 1885 and 1906.

Kenyon was born in London, the second son of Lloyd Kenyon, 3rd Baron Kenyon and his wife Hon. Georgina de Grey, daughter of Thomas de Grey, 4th Baron Walsingham. He was educated at Harrow School and at Christ Church, Oxford, where he graduated as Bachelor of Arts (BA) in 1864 and Master (MA) in 1870. He was called to the bar at Middle Temple in 1869.

He entered the North Shropshire Yeomanry Cavalry as a cornet in 1865, was lieutenant when the regiment amalgamated in the unified Shropshire Yeomanry regiment in 1872, was promoted captain in 1873, and resigned in 1879.

He was a J.P. and Deputy Lieutenant for Flintshire and a J.P. for Shropshire.  He was guardian to his nephew, Lloyd Tyrell-Kenyon, 4th Baron Kenyon who inherited the title at the age of five, of whom throughout his lifetime George was also heir-presumptive, his nephew then being unmarried.

At the 1874 and 1880 general elections, Kenyon stood unsuccessfully for the Denbigh Boroughs. He was elected Member of Parliament for Denbigh at the 1885 general election
 and held the seat until he stood down in 1895. He unsuccessfully stood at a by-election for East Denbighshire in 1897, losing mainly through his unpopular protectionist views. He was elected again for Denbigh Boroughs in 1900 and held the seat until he was defeated in 1906. In August 1907 he announced his intention not to stand for parliament again.

His main interests were in promoting secondary and further education in Wales. He promoted the passing of the Welsh Intermediate Education Act 1889, and was a founder of the University of Wales, which he served as Junior Deputy Chancellor in 1898–1900. He was founder Chairman of the Wrexham and Ellesmere Railway company from 1891 until his death.

Kenyon played cricket as a wicket keeper, playing in county matches for Cheshire, Denbighshire, and Shropshire while playing at club level for Hanmer.

Kenyon married Florence Anna Leche in 1875.

Kenyon lived at Llanerch-Panna, Penley, Flintshire, where he died at the age of 67 after failure to fully recover from a recent accident. He was buried on 30 January 1908 at nearby Hanmer churchyard.

References

External links
 

1840 births
1908 deaths
People educated at Harrow School
Alumni of Christ Church, Oxford
Conservative Party (UK) MPs for Welsh constituencies
UK MPs 1885–1886
UK MPs 1886–1892
UK MPs 1892–1895
UK MPs 1900–1906
Shropshire Yeomanry officers
Younger sons of barons